Dolgoma striola is a moth of the family Erebidae. It is found in China (Guangdong).

The forewings are bright yellow, dusted with diffuse brown dots and strokes. The hindwings are light yellow.

References

External links

Moths described in 2012
Endemic fauna of China
striola